In probability theory, the Borel–Cantelli lemma is a theorem about sequences of events. In general, it is a result in measure theory.  It is named after Émile Borel and Francesco Paolo Cantelli, who gave statement to the lemma in the first decades of the 20th century.  A related result, sometimes called the second Borel–Cantelli lemma, is a partial converse of the first Borel–Cantelli lemma.  The lemma states that, under certain conditions, an event will have probability of either zero or one. Accordingly, it is the best-known of a class of similar theorems, known as zero-one laws. Other examples include Kolmogorov's zero–one law and the Hewitt–Savage zero–one law.

Statement of lemma for probability spaces

Let E1,E2,... be a sequence of events in some probability space.
The Borel–Cantelli lemma states:

Here, "lim sup" denotes limit supremum of the sequence of events, and each event is a set of outcomes. That is, lim sup En is the set of outcomes that occur infinitely many times within the infinite sequence of events (En).  Explicitly,

The set lim sup En is sometimes denoted {En i.o. }, where "i.o." stands for "infinitely often". The theorem therefore asserts that if the sum of the probabilities of the events En is finite, then the set of all outcomes that are "repeated" infinitely many times must occur with probability zero. Note that no assumption of independence is required.

Example

Suppose (Xn) is a sequence of random variables with Pr(Xn = 0) = 1/n2 for each n. The probability that Xn = 0 occurs for infinitely many n is equivalent to the probability of the intersection of infinitely many [Xn = 0] events. The intersection of infinitely many such events is a set of outcomes common to all of them. Hence, the probability of Xn = 0 occurring for infinitely many n is 0. Almost surely (i.e., with probability 1), Xn is nonzero for all but finitely many n.

Proof 

Let (En) be a sequence of events in some probability space.

The sequence of events  is non-increasing:

By continuity from above,

By subadditivity,

By original assumption,  As the series  converges,

as required.

General measure spaces

For general measure spaces, the Borel–Cantelli lemma takes the following form:

Converse result

A related result, sometimes called the second Borel–Cantelli lemma, is a partial converse of the first Borel–Cantelli lemma. The lemma states: If the events En are independent and the sum of the probabilities of the En diverges to infinity, then the probability that infinitely many of them occur is 1. That is:

The assumption of independence can be weakened to pairwise independence, but in that case the proof is more difficult.

Example
The infinite monkey theorem, that endless typing at random will, with probability 1, eventually produce every finite text (such as the works of Shakespeare), amounts to the statement that a (not necessarily fair) coin tossed infinitely often will eventually come up Heads. This is a special case of the second Lemma. 

The lemma can be applied to give a covering theorem in Rn.  Specifically , if Ej is a collection of Lebesgue measurable subsets of a compact set in Rn such that

then there is a sequence Fj of translates

such that

apart from a set of measure zero.

Proof 

Suppose that   and the events   are independent. It is sufficient to show the event that the En's did not occur for infinitely many values of n has probability 0. This is just to say that it is sufficient to show that

Noting that:
, it is enough to show: .

The convergence test for infinite products guarantees that the product above is 0, if  diverges. This completes the proof.

Counterpart 

Another related result is the so-called counterpart of the Borel–Cantelli lemma.  It is a counterpart of the
Lemma in the sense that it gives a necessary and sufficient condition for the limsup to be 1 by replacing the independence assumption by the completely different assumption that  is monotone increasing for sufficiently large indices. This Lemma says:

Let  be such that ,
Then the probability of infinitely many  occur (that is, at least one  occurs) is one if and only if there exists a strictly increasing sequence of positive integers  such that

This simple result can be useful in problems such as for instance those involving hitting probabilities for stochastic process with the choice of the sequence  usually being the essence.

Kochen–Stone
 then there is a positive probability that  occur infinitely often.

See also
 Lévy's zero–one law
 Kuratowski convergence
 Infinite monkey theorem

References 

 
 .
 .
 .
 Durrett, Rick. "Probability: Theory and Examples." Duxbury advanced series, Third Edition, Thomson Brooks/Cole, 2005.

External links
 Planet Math Proof Refer for a simple proof of the Borel Cantelli Lemma

Theorems in measure theory
Probability theorems
Covering lemmas
Lemmas